Harrington Darnell Autry (born June 19, 1976) is a former American football player who played college football at Northwestern University.  In his sophomore season, he helped lead the 1995 Northwestern Wildcats to the Big Ten Conference Championship and the 1996 Rose Bowl.  Autry finished fourth in the Heisman Trophy balloting for 1995 and appeared on the cover of Sports Illustrated after a Northwestern victory over Penn State. Autry finished seventh in the 1996 Heisman Trophy balloting.

In his junior season, he led Northwestern to another share of the Big Ten championship.  After the season, Autry sued the NCAA to be allowed to act in a movie since he was a theater major and he did not want to lose NCAA eligibility.  The NCAA initially rejected his claims but eventually relented.  He was then drafted in the 1997 NFL Draft where he had little success playing for the Chicago Bears and Philadelphia Eagles.

References

External links
 

1976 births
Living people
American football running backs
American male actors
Northwestern Wildcats football players
Chicago Bears players
Philadelphia Eagles players
Sportspeople from Tempe, Arizona
Players of American football from Arizona